Diorygma microsporum is a species of lichen in the family Graphidaceae. It was described as new to science in 2011. It has a neotropical distribution, and has been collected in Florida, Colombia, and Brazil.

References

microsporum
Lichen species
Lichens of the Southeastern United States
Lichens of Brazil
Lichens of Colombia
Lichens described in 2011
Taxa named by Robert Lücking
Fungi without expected TNC conservation status